George Skelton (1826 – January 9, 1920) was a physician and political figure in Newfoundland. He represented Bonavista Bay in the Newfoundland and Labrador House of Assembly from 1878 to 1885.

He was born in Bonavista, the son of doctor John Skelton. Skelton studied medicine in Scotland and practised in Greenspond. He was named a magistrate in 1873. He was defeated when he ran for reelection in 1885 and 1889. From 1890 to 1920, Skelton served in the Legislative Council of Newfoundland. He died in St. John's in 1920.

References 
 

Members of the Newfoundland and Labrador House of Assembly
Members of the Legislative Council of Newfoundland
1826 births
1920 deaths
People from Bonavista, Newfoundland and Labrador
Dominion of Newfoundland politicians
Newfoundland Colony people